Private universities  and private colleges are institutions of higher education, not operated, owned, or institutionally funded by governments. They may (and often do) receive from governments tax breaks, public student loans, and grants. Depending on their location, private universities may be subject to government regulation. Private universities may be contrasted with public universities and national universities. Many private universities are nonprofit organizations.

Africa

Egypt 

Egypt currently has 20 public universities with about two million students and 23 private universities and 60,000 students.

Egypt has many private universities, including the American University in Cairo, the German University in Cairo, The British University in Egypt, the Arab Academy for Science, Technology and Maritime Transport, Misr University for Science and Technology, Misr International University, Future University in Egypt and Modern Sciences and Arts University.

In addition to the state-funded, national and private universities in Egypt (List of universities in Egypt), international university institutions were founded in the New Administrative Capital, which are hosting branches of Universities from abroad. Among such university institutions are The Knowledge Hub (TKH) and European Universities in Egypt (EUE).

Ethiopia

Traditional higher institution in Ethiopia is embraced by the Ethiopian Orthodox Tewahedo Church doctrine. Modern higher education probably traced back during Emperor Haile Selassie regime with the first university University College of Addis Ababa, now called the Addis Ababa University (AAU) formed in 1950. In 1954, the Haramaya University opened.

As of 2022, there are 83 private universities, and 42 public universities, and more than 35 institution of higher learning. There are 16,305 students enrolled in the whole higher education.

Ghana

There were few private universities in Ghana before the beginning of the 21st century. But since then, Ghana has seen a flood of the establishment of private universities and colleges, which is a reflection of the country's stable governance, and the pace of economic growth. Most of these universities are not known to be sponsored by foreign corporate organisations and government universities, and the aim is to avoid the Ghanaian government's excessive payment of bond which is a requirement for all foreign institutions endeavouring to operate businesses in the country. Almost all the private universities in Ghana have a similar kind of academic discipline, like business administration, human resource, accounting, information technology, etc., which are offered by universities like Ashesi, Regent, Valley View, Ghana Telecom, and others. The recent discovery of oil and gas in commercial quantities has influenced the development of oil and gas management courses within the private universities' curricula.

Libya 

Libya has number of recognised private education institutions and universities, approved by the Ministry of Higher Education, ranked and qualified to specialise in academic programs in Business Administration, Computer Science, Law, Medicine and Humanitarian. These institutions include:

 Al Rifaq University for Humanitarian and Applied Science – Tripoli City
 Ibn Al Haytham Center for Technology Education and Scientific research – Tripoli City
 Libyan International Medical University – Benghazi City
 Libyan University for Humanitarian and Applied Science – Tajora City
 Tripoli Community University – Tripoli
 Tripoli Institute for Medical Sciences – Tripoli City
 United Africa University – Zawia City

Nigeria 

The National Universities Commission of Nigeria has the responsibility to approve private universities and accredit their courses. This ensures a minimum standard in curriculum and teaching. There are currently 60 approved private universities in Nigeria and many applications being processed.

South Africa 

In South Africa, there are many distinctions between public universities and what are officially termed private higher education institutions. Recognised private higher education institutions include Akademia (af), Eduvos' Varsity College, Vega School, Milpark, Midrand Graduate Institute, and Regenesys Business School.

Asia

Bangladesh 

A number of private universities were established in Bangladesh after the Private Universities Act, 1992 was instituted, and consolidated and re-enacted as the Private Universities Act, 2010. All private universities must be approved by University Grants Commission (UGC) before they are given a permit to operate. See external links for: Private Universities Act 1992.

As of April 2018, there were 97 private universities in Bangladesh.

Brunei

Private institutions must confer the students with external programmes such as BDTVEC, the largest awarding body in the country, BTEC and Cambridge International Examinations pathways. Accreditation by Brunei Darussalam National Accreditation Council (BDNAC) is very crucial in order to establish a private institution.

 Laksamana College of Business (Brunei Campus of Kensington College of Business)

Cambodia 

Since 1997, private universities have been established in the Cambodia.

 IIC University of Technology (IICUT) – Phnom Penh
 Zaman University (ZAMANU) – Phnom Penh

China 

Since 2003, joint-partnership private universities have been established in the People's Republic of China (PRC). Typically, the partners are a Chinese university and a non-Chinese institution. English is often the only language of instruction at such universities, and many focus on providing a comprehensive liberal arts education modeled after research universities in the United States and Europe.

 Sanda University – Shanghai
 Duke Kunshan University (DKU) – Kunshan, Jiangsu
 SIAS International University (SIAS) – Xinzheng, Henan
 United International College (UIC) – Zhuhai, Guangdong
 University of Nottingham Ningbo, China (UNNC) – Ningbo, Zhejiang
 Xi'an Jiaotong-Liverpool University (XJTLU) – Suzhou, Jiangsu
 University of Xing Hua

Hong Kong 

Hong Kong Shue Yan University-  acquired university status on 19 December 2006
Hang Seng University of Hong Kong- acquired university status on 30 October 2018

India 

Universities in India are recognized by the University Grants Commission (UGC), which draws its power from the University Grants Commission Act, 1956. Private universities in India are regulated under the UGC (Establishment and Maintenance of Standards in Private Universities) Regulations, 2003. Per the UGC act and these regulations, private universities are established by an act of state legislative assemblies and listed by the UGC in the Gazette upon receiving the act. As confirmed by ruling of the Supreme Court of India, recognition by the UGC is required for the university to operate. Also per the 2003 regulations, the UGC sends committees to inspect the private universities and publishes their inspection report.

The UGC publishes and regularly updates the lists of private universities. , the UGC list of private universities lists 421 universities.

Indonesia 

(Incomplete list)
Al Azhar University of Indonesia - a private university located in Jakarta, Indonesia; established in 2000.
Bina Nusantara University
Darma Persada Daigaku
Islamic University of Indonesia – a private university located in Yogyakarta, Indonesia; established on 27 Rajab 1364 Hijri or on 8 July 1945 as STI (Sekolah Tinggi Islam – Islamic Higher School) by political figures of the day including Dr. Muhammad Hatta, Mohammad Natsir, Mohammad Roem, Wachid Hasyim as well as Abdul Kahar Mudzakir. STI developed into Universitas Islam Indonesia on 14 December 1947. Historically, UII is the first national university in Indonesia, and is also the oldest private university in the country.
Muhammadiyah University of Magelang – a private university belonging to Muhammadiyah organisation; known as UMMGL, standing for Universitas Muhammadiyah Magelang; founded on August 31, 1964
Muhammadiyah University of Yogyakarta – a private Islamic university in Yogyakarta known as UMY and established in 1981.
Ma Chung University – a private university founded by Peranakan Chinese Indonesians, established in 2007, located in Malang, East Java.
Parahyangan Catholic University – a private university located in Bandung which was established on 1955
President University
Telkom University

Iran 

Khayyam University of Mashhad
 The Islamic Azad University system
University of Science and Culture
International University of Chabahar
 University of Ershad-Damavand

Iraq

Ahlulbait University College – Karbala
Al Hadbaa University College – Al Musel
Al Maamoon University College – Baghdad
Al Maarif University College – Al-Anbar
Al Mansour University College – Baghdad
Al Rafidain University College – Baghdad
Al Rasheed University College – Baghdad
Al Turath University College – Baghdad
Al Yarmouk University College – Diala
Alsalam University College – Baghdad
Baghdad College of Economic Sciences University – Baghdad
Baghdad College of Pharmacy – Baghdad
Basrah University College of Science and Technology – Basrah
Business & Management University – Baghdad
Dijlah University College – Baghdad
Humanitarian Studies University College – Najaf
 Iraq University College – Basrah
Islamic University College – Najaf
 Konooz University College – Basrah
Madenat Alelem University College – Baghdad
Shat Al Arab College – Basrah
Komar University – Slaimani
Ishik University – Slaimani
The American University of Iraq – Sulaimani
Nawroz University – Erbil
Cihan University – Erbil
Cihan University – Slaimani
Knowledge University – Erbil
British Royal University – Erbil
Catholic University in Erbil – Erbil
Lebanese French University – Erbil
Imam Jafar Asadiq University – Baghdad

Israel

Reichman University – Hertzeliya

Japan 

 Japan had 597 private universities, while there are 86 national universities and 95 public universities. Private universities thus account for over 75% of all universities in Japan. Many, but not all, junior colleges in Japan are private. Like public and national universities, many private universities use National Center Test for University Admissions as an entrance exam.

The most notable private universities in Japan include:

Kantō region

International Christian University
Keio University
Sophia University
Tokyo University of Science
Waseda University

Another five colleges, called MARCH, include:

Meiji University
Aoyama Gakuin University
Rikkyo University
Chuo University
Hosei University
Takushoku University

Chūbu region

Nanzan University

Kansai region

Doshisha University
Kansai University
Kwansei Gakuin University
Kindai University
Ritsumeikan University

Jordan 

There are one private university in Madaba city: 
 American University of Madaba (AUM).

Kuwait 

There are 11 private universities and colleges in Kuwait:

 American University of Kuwait (AUK)
 American International University (AIU)
 Kuwait College of Science and Technology (KCST)
 American University of the Middle East (AUM)
 Australian College of Kuwait (ACK)
 Gulf University for Science and Technology (GUST)
 Kuwait-Maastricht Business School
 American College of the Middle East (ACM)
 Arab Open University (AOU) – Kuwait branch 
 Box Hill College Kuwait 
 College of Aviation Technology

Lebanon 

There are 19 private universities in Lebanon. Among these, the American University of Beirut and the Lebanese American University are internationally acknowledged.

The languages of teaching in private universities are mainly French and English, while Arabic is widely used in religious universities and Armenian is used in the Armenian university.

The first university opened in Lebanon was the Syrian Protestant College in 1866 (which became the American University of Beirut in 1921). It was founded by Daniel Bliss, a Protestant missionary. The second university opened in Lebanon was the Université Saint-Joseph, founded by the Jesuits in 1875.

Macau 

City University of Macau
Macau University of Science and Technology
University of Saint Joseph

Malaysia 

The private universities in Malaysia include:

 Universiti Tenaga Nasional
 Curtin University Sarawak
 Monash University Malaysia Campus
 Multimedia University
 New Era University College
 Royal College of Surgeons in Ireland and University College Dublin Malaysia Campus
 Southern University College
 Sunway University
 Swinburne University of Technology Sarawak Campus
 Tunku Abdul Rahman University College
 Taylor's University
 Universiti Teknologi Petronas
 Universiti Tunku Abdul Rahman
 Wawasan Open University

For complete list of private universities in Malaysia, see the list of private universities in Malaysia.

Myanmar 

The private universities in Myanmar include:

 Info Myanmar University
 STI Myanmar University
 Myanmar Imperial University
 Victoria University College
 Strategy First University
 Gusto University
 Chindwin College
 IQY Technical College
 STC Technological University
 IPEM Technological University
 Myanmar Commercial Management Institute (MCMI)
 Mandalay Business School

Nepal 

 Kathmandu University – When established in November 1991 as a non-profit, autonomous, public university,
by an Act, Kathmandu University became the first privately managed public institution of higher learning in Nepal.

Oman 

Oman is home to several private universities, including Sohar University, University of Nizwa, Middle East College, and German University of Technology in Oman. These universities offer a range of undergraduate, graduate, and professional programs in fields such as business, engineering, and information technology. Private universities in Oman offer a more personalized and interactive learning experience, as the student-teacher ratio is typically lower and there are more opportunities for hands-on learning. Additionally, private universities in Oman often have more flexible curriculums and are able to respond quickly to changing labor markets and global trends.  

All private universities in Oman must be recognised by the Omani Ministry of Higher Education in order to offer degree programs and receive approval for new degrees. The Ministry has procedures and standards that all universities must meet in order to receive accreditation and be recognised as an institution of higher education.

Pakistan 

The Higher Education Commission (HEC), formerly the University Grant Commission (UGC), is the primary regulator of higher education in Pakistan. It also facilitates the development of the higher educational system in Pakistan. Its main purpose is to upgrade the schools to be world-class centres of education, research and development. It also plays a leading role towards building a knowledge-based economy in Pakistan by giving out hundreds of doctoral scholarships for education abroad every year.

In spite of the criticism of the HEC, its creation has also had a positive impact on higher education in Pakistan. Its two-year report for 2004 to 2006 states that according to the Institute of Scientific Information, the total number of publications appearing in the 8,000 leading journals indexed in the web of science arising out of Pakistan in 2005 was 1,259 articles, representing a 41% increase over the past two years and a 60% increase since the establishment of HEC in 2002. The HEC digital library now provides access to over 20,000 leading research journals, covering about 75% of the world's peer-reviewed scientific journals.

Until 1991, there were only two recognized private universities in Pakistan: Aga Khan University, established in 1983 and Lahore University of Management Sciences, established in 1985. By 1997, however, there were 10 private universities. In 2001–2002, this number had doubled to 20. Among the first to gain degree awarding status was Hajvery University, Lahore (HU), established in 1990. In 2003–2004 Pakistan had a total of 83 private degree granting institutions.

Saudi Arabia 

There are nine private universities in Saudi Arabia:

 Al Yamamah University
 Alfaisal University
 Arab Open University
 Dar Al Uloom University
 Effat University
 Fahd bin Sultan University
 King Abdullah University of Science and Technology
 Prince Mohammad bin Fahd University
 Prince Sultan University

Singapore 

Stansfield College, founded in 1993, is a private higher education institution and a provider of the University of London International Programmes in Singapore. Through its collaboration with the University of London, Stansfield offers undergraduate degrees and diplomas in a range of academic disciplines which include Law, the Humanities, and the EMFSS suite of programmes with specialisations in Accounting, Business & Management, Banking & Finance, Economics, Mathematics & Economics and the Social Sciences. The college has also expanded its range of programmes to include several university foundation awards including certificate and diploma programmes that allow students to progress academically at Stansfield or to gain admissions into overseas universities. The college also provides postgraduate diplomas and executive development courses and seminars.

The college enrolls over 500, with students from over 30 countries studying at its campus.

Auston Institute of Management is another example of a private 'university' where students who study at the college receive university awards from degree-awarding partners overseas. Auston rose to fame in the early 2000s with a collaboration with Coventry University. This partnership ended in 2012 and was replaced with new partners including London South Bank University, University of Wolverhampton, Birmingham City University, Chichester University and De Montfort University. Auston is known for its hands-on approach and its emphasis in technical areas of study such as electronics, mechatronics, computer security, and various forms of software engineering.

Auston graduates about 400 students per year from as many as eight different countries, all studying in Singapore for UK degree awards.

South Korea 

Busan University of Foreign Studies
Chung-Ang University
Dong-A University
Dongseo University
Handong Global University
Hankuk University of Foreign Studies
Hanyang University
Hongik University
Konkuk University
Keimyung University
Kookmin University
Korea University
Kwangwoon University
Kyung Hee University
Kyungsung University
Sogang University
Sungkyunkwan University
Yonsei University

Sri Lanka 

In Sri Lanka, state recognized private institutes are allowed to award degrees under Section 25A of the Universities Act No. 16 of 1978. The University Grants Commission is responsible for the accreditation of these institutes and degrees. These mostly provide undergraduate degrees, with a limited few proving postgraduate degrees. The Informatics Institute of Sri Lanka (IIT), NSBM Green University (NSBM), Horizon Campus and Sri Lanka Institute for Information Technology (SLIIT) are examples. Some foreign universities franchise parts of their degree courses in Sri Lanka with local institutes. Students are charged for the study (some of these institutes are state funded institutions of their home countries) and these charges are often a fraction of the cost studying in the home countries of these institutions.

Efforts to establish private universities have been blocked due to protests from state universities' undergraduates and leftist political parties.

Many private colleges have sprung up since, including the Auston Institute of Management, Singapore. The Sri Lanka campus was established in 2010 and is a Board of Investment or (BOI) company. It retains a similar focus to the home campus and occupies a prime spot along Colombo's famous Galle Road.

Syria 
 Al-Andalus University
 Al Rasheed International University
 Al-Shahba University
 Al-Wataniya Private University
 Aljazeera University
 Arab International University
 Ebla Private University
 Hawash Private University
 International University for Science and Technology
 Ittihad Private University
 Mamoun University for Science and Technology
 Syrian Private University
 University of Kalamoon
 Wadi International University
 Yarmouk Private University

Taiwan 

In Taiwan, unlike the United States, private universities are typically not as prestigious as some public (national) universities. They are not as highly ranked as public institutions, and also cost nearly twice as much. This is due to the form of testing in schools in Taiwan, in which students take a national entrance exam to determine their university qualifications. The famous private university is Fu Jen Catholic University, and the earliest is Tunghai University.

Thailand 

 Asia-Pacific International University – Saraburi
 Asian University – Chonburi
 Assumption University – Bangkok
 Bangkok University – Bangkok
 Bangkokthonburi University – Bangkok
 Chaopraya University – Nakhon Sawan
 Christian University – Nakhon Pathom
 Chulabhorn Graduate Institute – Bangkok
 Dhurakij Pundit University – Bangkok
 Dusit Thani College – Bangkok
 E-sarn University – Khon Kaen
 Eastern Asia University – Pathumthani
 The Far Eastern University – Chiang Mai
 Hatyai University – Songkhla
 Huachiew Chalermprakiet University – Bangkok
 Kasem Bundit University – Bangkok
 Krirk University – Bangkok
 Mahanakorn University of Technology – Bangkok
 North Chiang Mai University – Chiang Mai
 North Eastern University – Khon Kaen
 Pathumthani University – Pathumthani
 Payap University – Chiang Mai
 Rangsit University – Pathumthani
 Ratchathani University – Ubon Ratchathani
 Rattana Bundit University – Bangkok
 Saint John's University – Bangkok
 Shinawatra University – Pathumthani
 Siam University – Bangkok
 South-East Asia University – Bangkok
 Sripatum University – Khon Kaen and Bangkok
 Stamford International University – Phetchaburi
 Thai-Nichi Institute of Technology – Bangkok
 Thonburi University – Bangkok
 University of the Thai Chamber of Commerce – Bangkok
 Vongchavalitkul University – Nakhon Ratchasima
 Webster University Thailand – Phetchaburi
 Yala Islamic University – Yala

United Arab Emirates 

 World Master Academy – Dubai

Vietnam 

Since the 1990s, a number of private universities have opened in Vietnam. Ho Chi Minh City Open University was one of the first. Typical characteristics of Vietnamese private universities  are higher (very high in some cases) tuition fees, poor infrastructure, and limited faculty and human resources.

Private universities are often named after scholars (Fulbright University Vietnam, Vo Truong Toan University, Nguyen Trai University, Luong The Vinh University, Chu Van An University, Yersin University, Phan Chau Trinh University), or heroes/legends (Hung Vuong University, Quang Trung University), although there are exceptions, such as FPT University, named after the FPT Corporation and Tan Tao University in Tan Tao Group.

In Vietnam, there exists the "semi-private university"; schools in this category can receive partial financial support from the government. Almost all private universities have to invite professors and lecturers from state universities. Many lecturers from state-owned universities take up positions in private universities after their retirement.

Europe

Armenia 

There are a number of private universities and independent faculties in Armenia, mostly in Yerevan. As of 2022, there are 31 private higher education institutions in the country, most notably is the American University of Armenia and the Eurasia International University.

Austria

In Austria, educational institutions must be authorised by the country to legally grant academic degrees. All state-run universities are governed by the 2002 Austrian Universities' and University Degree Programmes' Organisation Act (Federal Law Gazette No. 120/2002). In 1999, a federal law (Universitäts-Akkreditierungsgesetz) was passed to allow the accreditation of private universities. The Akkreditierungsrat (Accreditation Council)  evaluates applicants and issues recommendations to the responsible Austrian accreditation authority (the Austrian Federal Ministry of Science & Research).

Accreditation by the council yields a couple of privileges: degrees issued by accredited private universities have the same legal status as those issued by state-run universities. Private universities can appoint or promote professors. Their students enjoy the same privileges pertaining to social security, foreigner law and state scholarships as students of the state universities. Educational services of private universities are not subject to value added tax, and donations are tax deductible.

Accreditations must be renewed regularly and can be withdrawn, e.g. in the case of repeated academic misconduct as happened in 2003 when the accreditation of International University Vienna was withdrawn. In 2006, when the accreditation of Imadec University expired, the Accreditation Council rejected requests for renewal.

Austrian law provides that private universities in Austria must use the term Privatuniversität (literally, "private university") in their German names, although their formal names in other languages are not regulated. Thus, there is the possibility of private institutions employing the term "university" as opposed to "private university" in their advertisements in all languages except German while still complying with Austrian law.

While the legal definition of "private university" prohibits funding by the federal government of Austria, funding by other public bodies is not prohibited. Consequently, some of Austria's private universities are partly or wholly funded by provincial governments, while others are fully privately funded.

Accreditation of private universities began in 2001. , Austria has 16 private universities. Most are small (fewer than 1000 students) and specialise in only one or two fields of study:

 Anton Bruckner Private University – Linz
 Bertha von Suttner Private University – Sankt Pölten
 Catholic Private University Linz
 Central European University – Vienna
 Danube Private University – Krems an der Donau
 Gustav Mahler Private University for Music – Klagenfurt am Wörthersee
 Jam Music Lab Private University for Jazz and Popular Music Vienna
 Karl Landsteiner University of Health Sciences – Krems an der Donau
 Music and Arts University of the City of Vienna – Vienna
 Modul University Vienna
 New Design University St. Pölten
 Paracelsus Medical University – Salzburg
 Seeburg Castle University in Seekirchen – near Salzburg
 Sigmund Freud University Vienna
 UMIT - Private University for Health Sciences, Medical Informatics and Technology – Hall in Tirol
 Webster Vienna Private University (also accredited in the US)

Four former private universities are not accredited any more:
 International University Vienna: Accreditation was withdrawn in 2003 due to academic misconduct.
 Imadec University: First accreditation period ended in January 2006 and was not renewed.
 TCM Privatuniversität Li Shi Zhen in Vienna: Accreditation period ended 2009; TCM did not call for renewal. All students could finish their studies.
 PEF Private University of Management Vienna: The university closed for economic reasons in March 2012. All students could finish their studies.

Belgium 

Belgium makes a distinction between free institutions (as in free from the State), which are recognised and funded by the Communities of Belgium (the State until 1990) and follow the same rules and laws as fully public universities, and fully private institutions, which are not recognised nor funded by the authorities, and thus do not issue valid degrees.

Private (free) institutions are predominantly Catholic, : UCLouvain, KU Leuven or Saint-Louis University, Brussels. On the contrary, the Free University of Brussels (nowadays split into ULB and VUB) was founded by masonic individuals. All started to get recognised by the State from 1891 onwards.

It is forbidden by law to call a fully private institution "university" or "faculty", meaning fully private (non-free) 'universities' have limited visibility.

Bulgaria 

Bulgaria has a number of private universities, among which the most renowned are New Bulgarian University, located in the capital city Sofia; Burgas Free University; Varna Free University and American University in Bulgaria.

Finland 

Finland does not officially recognise private universities, but does not explicitly forbid them either. Helsinki School of Business is an example of one such educational institution operating in this market.

France 

Since 1880, it is forbidden by law for a private institution to be called "université", and the most of the universities are public.

Some elder private institutions are created in 1875, under the regime of the Free Higher Education Act of 1875. These institutions are called catholic universities, or la Catho, since 1880 formally theCatholic Institutes. There are five:

 Lille Catholic University
 Lyon Catholic University
 Paris Catholic University
 Catholic University of Toulouse
 West Catholic University.

These institutions provide courses in all academic fields (engineering, law, medical, economics, arts, business administration, sociology). One may join university after a high school degree and study there for a licence (bachelor), master's degree, or doctoral program. By law private institutions may grant State's degrees after to contract with public universities.

Grandes écoles can be public or private, but the most prestigious ones are public. These institutions operate mostly in engineering studies and business administration. Universities and grandes écoles compete in these two fields. Some of them report to the Ministry of Higher Education, such as Arts et Métiers ParisTech and École centrale Paris, and a few to the Ministry of Defense, such as École polytechnique. Several private grandes écoles are members of the Conférence des Grandes Écoles, a lobbying group representing grandes écoles. Most grandes écoles can be joined after following two years of classe préparatoire aux grandes écoles, an intensive program following the baccalauréat. A selective examination after the two additional years is taken to enter a grande école. Following the Bologna Process, this full 5 year courses (two years of preparatory classes plus 3 years in engineering or business school) is equivalent to a master's degree.

Grandes écoles for studying business administration are usually part of the chambers of commerce. For example, HEC is part of the Chamber of Commerce of Paris (CCIP), and is therefore semi-private.

Germany 

Germany has 83 private universities (called Privathochschule) and 45 church-run universities (called kirchliche Hochschule). Similar to the state-run universities, they are subdivided into Universitäten (research universities), Fachhochschulen (universities of applied science) and Kunst- und Musikhochschulen (art schools). Private universities in Germany need institutional accreditation by the state.

The first private university in Germany, the Ukrainian Free University, was established 16 September 1950 in Munich. EBS University of Business and Law opened in 1971. Witten/Herdecke University opened in 1982 and Zeppelin University in 2003. Though private universities are numerous in Germany, they represent only less than 1% of all students. Some private universities, including Hanseatic University Rostock (2007–2009) and the International University in Germany in Bruchsal, have gone out of business.

Most of the church universities are run by the Protestant or Catholic churches; however, there is one Jewish university (Hochschule für Jüdische Studien) in Heidelberg.

Greece 

In Greece, private universities are prohibited by the constitution (Article 16).  However, laboratories of liberal studies operate freely in the country, and, based on a law from the 1930s they are registered as private for-profit businesses and regulated by the Greek Ministry of Commerce.  Their academic degrees, which are not recognised in Greece, are directly provided to students by foreign universities in the United Kingdom, United States of America, or other countries, usually through franchise or validation agreements (the franchise agreement usually being considered better).  This has limited access to the laboratories, which usually teach in English, to high-income Greeks who for various reasons (usually family matters) did not want to go abroad.

In 2008, a law was introduced that forced all private institutions collaborating with foreign universities to offer programmes in the country, to register with the Greek Ministry of Education and Religious Affairs as colleges by August 2009. Further amendments to the framework in 2010, 2012 and 2013 (4111/2013, 4093/2012) were introduced. Today there are a series of private colleges in Greece mostly in Athens and Thessaloniki.

Hungary 

 Central European University – Budapest; a founding member of the European University Association (EUA)

Ireland 

In the Republic of Ireland, a private university (more commonly known as a private college) is one that is not funded by the state, and therefore not covered by the free-fees initiative. All universities, institutes of technology, colleges of education, and the National College of Ireland and some religious institutions are publicly funded and therefore covered by free-fees initiative. There are few private colleges, and they are highly specialised, such as Griffith College Dublin, Dorset College and Dublin Business School. The Higher Education Colleges Association is a representative body for private colleges in Ireland. Private colleges in Ireland can seek to have their programmes validated/accredited by the Higher Education and Training Awards Council.

Italy

 Maria SS. Assunta University – LUMSA (Rome, Palermo, Taranto, Gubbio)
 University of International Studies of Rome – UNINT (Rome)
 Link Campus University (Rome)
 IULM University (Milan)
 LUISS – Free International University for Social Studies "Guido Carli" (Rome)
 Jean Monnet Free University (Casamassima)
 Carlo Cattaneo University -LIUC (Castellanza)
 Catholic University of the Sacred Heart (Milan, Rome, Brescia, Campobasso, Piacenza, Cremona)
 Biomedical University of Rome (Rome)
 Bocconi University (Milan)
 Suor Orsola Benincasa University of Naples (Naples, Pomigliano d'Arco, Salerno)
 University of Gastronomic Sciences (Bra, Colorno)
 Vita-Salute San Raffaele University (Milan, Cesano Maderno)
 European University of Rome (Rome)
 Humanitas University (Rozzano)

Netherlands 

Nyenrode Business University is the only private university in the Netherlands at the graduate level. The university was founded in 1946. It serves as a graduate school for business and management. Both programs are taught in English. Recently, Nyenrode merged with the Institute for CPA Education and both institutions share their facilities. The Nyenrode Business University also contains a campus and active student body.

Other Dutch private universities are universities of applied science where one can obtain a bachelor's or master's degree but not a PhD. These include Wittenborg University, Business School Notenboom (founded in 1958) and IVA Driebergen for the automotive industry with its earliest beginnings in 1930.

Poland 

 SWPS University of Social Sciences and Humanities
 John Paul II Catholic University of Lublin
There are 321 accredited private colleges in Poland. They award bachelor's degrees, master's degrees and doctorate degrees.

Portugal 

The oldest non-state-run university, the Universidade Católica Portuguesa – UCP (Catholic University of Portugal), a Catholic private university (concordatory status) was the first to be founded, in 1967, and officially recognized in 1971. UCP offers some well-recognized degrees and is reputed for the economics, law and business management degrees it awards at its Lisbon branch.

After the Carnation Revolution of 1974, in the 1980s and 1990s, a boom of educational private institutions was experienced in Portugal, and many private universities started to open. Most had a poor reputation and were known for making it easy for students to enter and also to get high grades. In 2007, several of those private universities, or their heirs, were investigated and faced compulsory closing (for example, the infamous Independente University and Internacional University closings, and the Moderna University scandal) or official criticism with recommendations that the state-managed investigation proposed for improving their quality and avoid termination.

In the mid-2000s, within the Bologna process, a reorganization of higher education was started which included more stringent regulations for private education and expanded state policies with regard to private education quality assurance and educational accreditation. In general, the private higher education institutions were often considered the schools of last resort for underachieving applicants who didn't score enough points in the admission examinations to enter the main public institutions.

Nearly open-admission policies have hurt private universities' reputation and the actual quality of their alumni. Without large endowments like those received, for example, by many US private universities and colleges which are attractive to the best scholars, researchers and students, the private higher education institutions of Portugal, with a few exceptions, do not have either the financial support or the academic profile to reach the highest teaching and research standards of the top Portuguese public universities. In addition, most private universities have faced a restrictive lack of collaboration with the major enterprises which, however, have developed fruitful relationships with many public higher education institutions. Most Portuguese private universities specialise in a limited number of fields, most often in the social sciences and humanities.

Serbia 

There are a number of private universities and independent faculties in Serbia, mostly in Belgrade. They were founded in the 1990s and 2000s.

Switzerland 

In addition to the public Universities in Switzerland, Switzerland has several private universities.

Turkey 

In Turkey, private universities have to be and all belong to and run by foundations (non-profit private legal entities) due to the high Education Law, article 3-c and annexed article 2 and these universities have public legal personality according to said law and defined as Foundation University (in Turkish: Vakıf Üniversitesi) in the relevant regulation. Therefore, a university organized in this type is commonly referred as a foundation university instead of a private university in Turkish. Currently, there are 66 private universities. Bilkent University, founded in 1984, was the first.

In Turkey, according to the laws of private universities, on the recommendation of the Higher Education Council is established by law. The establishment of such universities, established a new university building or in the form of a higher education institution will be the name of the university. Foundations for the establishment of the university, the university faculty, the formation of at least two of the bodies of the faculties of arts and science education programs related to the fields to be present, the university of arts and science programs to be among the first to be launched training programs and eligible to attend the university's commitment to the education of students in these programs start year necessary.

Turkey's private universities include:

 Acıbadem University – Istanbul
 Atılım University – Ankara
 Bahçeşehir University – Istanbul
 Başkent University – Ankara
 Beykent University – Istanbul
 Bilkent University – Ankara
 Çankaya University – Ankara
 Istanbul Aydın University – Istanbul
 Istanbul Bilgi University – Istanbul
 Istanbul Medipol University – Istanbul
 İzmir University of Economics – İzmir
 Kadir Has University – Istanbul
 Koç University – Istanbul
 Sabancı University – Istanbul
 TOBB University of Economics and Technology – Ankara
 University of Turkish Aeronautical Association – Ankara
 Yaşar University – İzmir
 Yeditepe University – Istanbul

United Kingdom 

There are six fully private universities in the United Kingdom: the non-profit University of Buckingham, Regent's University London and Richmond, The American International University in London, and the for-profit BPP University, University of Law and Arden University.

All other British universities are partly publicly funded and regulated: the government regulates their tuition fees, student funding and student loans and commissions and regulates research assessments and teaching reviews. However, unlike in Continental European countries, the British government does not own universities' assets, and university staff are not civil servants: status as a public body arises from accepting funding from bodies such as the Office for Students (OfS) in England, and any university can, in principle, choose to leave the publicly funded sector and the associated fee cap (although they would still remain subject to OfS regulation, which applies to all higher education providers in England).  Since September 2012 government funding for teaching and background funding for research has been substantially reduced, with one study from that year indicating that annual government funding for teaching and research would make up just 15% of universities’ income by 2015.

In the UK, an institution can only use the title "University" or "University College" if it has been granted by the Privy Council or (in England) by the Office for Students, under the terms of the Further and Higher Education Act 1992 as amended by the Higher Education and Research Act 2017.

North America

Canada 

There are several private universities in Canada that have been granted the power to award degrees by a provincial authority. However, the majority of degree-granting institutions in the country are public universities; a result of the Canadian university system's historic reliance on government funds for support. The oldest private universities in Canada operated as seminaries or as religiously affiliated institutions, although several for-profit and not-for-profit private universities were opened in Canada during the late-20th and early 21st century.

Dominica 

All Saints University School of Medicine
International University for Graduate Studies
New World University
Ross University School of Medicine
Western Orthodox University

Guatemala 

In Guatemala, the only public university is Universidad de San Carlos de Guatemala. The rest of the degree offering institutions in the country are private. See list of universities in Guatemala for a list of the private universities in the country.

Mexico 

Mexico has private and public (government managed) universities. Public universities are free or require a very minimum fee and private universities usually charge for an initial enrollment and monthly fees.

The well known private universities in Mexico are:

 Tecnológico de Monterrey 
 Universidad Iberoamericana 
 Panamerican University 
 Universidad Anáhuac 
 University of the Americas 
 Universidad La Salle 
 Universidad del Valle de México

United States

Apart from the five United States military academies, almost all public higher education institutions are sponsored and overseen by U.S. states, not the Federal government. Private colleges and universities are generally owned by either a nonprofit corporation or a for-profit corporation, and usually participate in higher education accreditation in the United States. In the US, 4,648 out of 6,606 post-secondary institutions (70%) were private as of 2016–17, of which 1,823 (39%) were non-profit and 2,825 (61%) were for-profit. Among degree-granting four-year institutions, 2,095 were private out of 2,832 (74%), of which 1,581 (75%) were non-profit and 514 (25%) were for-profit.

About 20 percent of American college students attend private colleges. Most of the remainder attend state-supported schools. Universities base their selections on academic performance as well as many secondary factors.

Tuition at private universities tends to be higher than at public universities, though many private universities offer financial aid as well. For example, at Washington University in St. Louis, 45% of students receive some form of financial support from either the university or the federal government, averaging $53,423.

Oceania

Australia 

There are currently three private universities in Australia. Bond University, Australia's first private university, dates from 1987. Situated on the Gold Coast, it runs three semesters per year (correlating exactly with the Northern and Southern Hemispheres' schedules), which allows a student to complete a six semester degree in two years, and an eight semester degree (e.g. Law) in under three years. The University of Notre Dame Australia, a private Catholic university based in Fremantle, was established two years later in 1989, and the newest of the three, Torrens University Australia, opened in Adelaide in 2014.

South America

Argentina 

Even though Argentina has a robust network of free public universities it also has over thirty private universities accredited by the national Ministry of Education. All accredited private higher education institutions must be run by nonprofit organizations. Other for-profit institutions exist but can not give out official degrees or call themselves universities.

Chile 

Chile has 31 completely private universities and an additional 14 universities which are run by private organizations (mostly religious) but receive some state funding.

Peru 

Peru has private and public universities. Private universities include:

 Cayetano Heredia University (non-profit)
 University of Lima  (non-profit)
 University of the Pacific (non-profit)
 Peruvian University of Applied Sciences
 César Vallejo University
 University of Piura (non-profit)
 Ricardo Palma University (non-profit)
 Universidad San Ignacio de Loyola
 Female University of the Sacred Heart (non-profit)
 Private University of the North
 Los Andes University (non-profit)
 Marcelino Champagnat University (non-profit)
 Pontifical Catholic University of Peru (non-profit)
 Catholic University of Santa María (non-profit)

References 

 
Education economics
Types of university or college